Stephen Andrew Bustin (born 1954) is a British scientist, former professor of molecular sciences at Queen Mary University of London from 2004 to 2012, as well as visiting professor at Middlesex University, beginning in 2006. In 2012 he was appointed Professor of Allied Health and Medicine at Anglia Ruskin University. He is known for his research into polymerase chain reaction, and has written a book on the topic, entitled A-Z of Quantitative PCR. This book has been called "the bible of qPCR."

Education
Bustin obtained his B.A. and PhD from Trinity College, Dublin in molecular genetics.

Career
Following the merger with St Bartholomew's Medical College and Queen Mary University of London, Bustin was promoted to Reader in Molecular Medicine in 2002, followed by the award of a personal chair as Professor of Molecular Science in 2004 at Barts and The London School of Medicine and Dentistry. , Bustin held the position of Professor of Molecular Medicine at Anglia Ruskin University. He is a fellow of the Society of Biology.

Bustin also co-founded and edits the journal Biomolecular Detection and Quantification to provide a peer-reviewed outlet for "high-quality quantitative studies".

Research
His research group’s general areas of interest are the small and large bowel, as well as colorectal cancer with particular emphasis on investigating the process of invasion and metastasis. An important aim is to translate molecular techniques into clinical practice by including molecular parameters into clinical tumor staging. To this end, Bustin has published many papers on PCR techniques, in particular reverse transcription polymerase chain reaction, the subject of his most cited paper, published in 2000.

He also developed the MIQE guidelines in a 2009 paper published in Clinical Chemistry, the goal of which is to create guidelines for how PCR should be performed to ensure that PCR results are being reliably conducted and interpreted, as well as to make replication of experiments easier.
This paper is the fifth most cited one ever to be published in Clinical Chemistry, with over 1700 citations on Google Scholar as of September 2013.

Testimony

Autism omnibus trial
Bustin testified on behalf of the Department of Justice in the autism omnibus trial about what he stated was the unreliability of the O'Leary lab's results with regard to testing for contamination. The lab had claimed to find measles virus in the intestines of children with developmental disorders. Bustin describes his conclusions with regard to the lab's alleged detection of measles virus RNA as follows: "My clear conclusion then was that O'Leary's results were caused by defective experimental technique and inappropriate interpretation of results, since he was detecting DNA, and measles virus does not exist as DNA." Bustin was described as "one of the most highly qualified and credible expert witnesses I [the Special Master] have ever encountered." In addition to his testimony, Bustin published an analysis of Andrew Wakefield's 2002 study, which had been published in the journal Molecular Pathology. This analysis, like Bustin's testimony, concluded that "The only conclusion possible is that the assays were detecting contaminating DNA. Since MeV is an RNA-only virus and never exists in DNA form, these data must be ignored and it is my opinion that the authors should withdraw this publication from the peer-reviewed literature."

Lundy murders
Bustin testified in the trials pertaining to the Lundy murders in 2015, criticizing tests that had claimed to detect human brain cells on Mark Lundy's shirt.

References

External links

1954 births
Academics of Anglia Ruskin University
Academics of Queen Mary University of London
Alumni of Trinity College Dublin
Autism researchers
British molecular biologists
Living people